Lego Digital Designer was a CAD software made by Lego which allowed people to design a virtual model using a selection of virtual Lego bricks. These models could be saved locally, as well as uploaded to the Lego website for sharing and ordering as a physical product. It is available for macOS and Windows, but only as a 32-bit application, which means that it no longer runs on current versions of macOS. The program allows users to build models using virtual Lego bricks, in a computer-aided design like manner. Until January 16, 2012, these could be uploaded, along with instructions and a box design, to the Lego Design byME website, from where the models could be ordered for delivery as a real, packaged set. Users can also take screenshots of their models and store the models on their computer in an .LXF file. On November 9, 2011, Lego declared that the Design byME service was going to end on January 16, 2012, due to its failure to meet quality expectations and for being too complex. In its absence, custom brick orders have had to be made via the Pick a Brick service. The closing of Design byME has not affected the ability of users to print custom instructions for their models.

On January 21, 2016, Lego announced the project had been defunded, and would not receive additional updates. However, in March 2016, a new updated version, 4.3.9, was uploaded. The latest version, 4.3.12 was uploaded in late 2019. As of 2023, Lego Digital Designer is unavailable to download from Lego's website, with its former page redirecting to the download page for BrickLink Studio.

A special version of Lego Digital Designer (Hollywood Edition) was used in the making of the Lego Movie franchise. The Hollywood Edition has also been used in the creation of Forza Horizon 4 - Lego Speed Champions.

See also 
 LeoCAD

References

Lego products
Computer-aided design software